Botanical Garden of Vilnius University is a botanical garden situated in Vilnius, Lithuania.

History
The garden was established  by professor Jean-Emmanuel Gilibert of Vilnius University in 1781. In 1832 the Vilnius University and Botanical Garden were closed. In 1919, the Botanical Garden of the Polish Stefan Batory University was started in a new location, in Vingis (known as Zakret at that time). In 1975 territory of the garden was expanded. Since then the main part of the garden is in  Kairėnai (address: Kairėnų 43, LT-10239 Vilnius) which is situated in Antakalnis elderate of Vilnius. There is also a department of the garden in Vingis Park (address: M. K. Čiurlionio 110, LT-03100 Vilnius).

Collection
The collection of the botanical garden includes 11,000 taxa of plants, including:
 2,500 taxa in Department of Dendrology
 3,000 taxa in Department of Plant Systematic and Geography
 3,200 taxa in Department of Floriculture
 300 taxa in Department of Plant Genetic
 750 taxa in Department of Pomology
 100 taxa in Laboratory of Plant Physiology and Isolated Tissue Cultures

About one third of the Lithuanian vascular plant inhabit the territory of the garden.

Research
The botanical garden carries out research in the areas of biotechnology, horticulture, molecular genetics, conservation, ethnobotany, systematics and taxonomy.

References

External links
 
 Virtual Tour

Botanical gardens in Lithuania
Buildings and structures in Vilnius
Buildings and structures of Vilnius University
Vilnius University Botanical garden
Botanical research institutes
Tourist attractions in Vilnius